Vasto Cathedral is a Roman Catholic cathedral in Vasto, Abruzzo, Italy, dedicated to Saint Joseph. Formerly the episcopal seat of the Diocese of Vasto, it is now a co-cathedral in the Archdiocese of Chieti-Vasto.

History 
Vasto Cathedral was built some time during the 13th century as St. Augustine, but it was soon changed to its current name. It was dedicated as a cathedral by then-Pope Pius IX in 1853, but demoted to co-cathedral in 1986.

References

Vasto
Roman Catholic cathedrals in Italy
Vasto